Hydrolith may refer to:

 the philosopher's stone
 a trade name for calcium hydride
 a technique used in immersion lithography